The 1998–99 Vancouver Canucks season was the team's 29th in the National Hockey League (NHL). The Canucks missed the playoffs for the third consecutive season.

Off-season

Regular season

The Canucks led the league in power-play opportunities against, with 450, and short-handed goals, with 17.

Final standings

Schedule and results

Player statistics

Awards and records

Transactions

Trades

Draft picks
Vancouver's picks at the 1998 NHL Entry Draft in Buffalo, New York.

Farm teams
Syracuse Crunch (AHL)

See also
1998–99 NHL season

References
 
 
 
 
Notes
 

Vancouver Canucks season, 1998-99
Vancouver Canucks seasons
Vancouver C